The following is an alphabetical list of members of the United States House of Representatives from the state of Oklahoma.  For chronological tables of members of both houses of the United States Congress from the state (through the present day), see United States congressional delegations from Oklahoma.  The list of names should be complete (as of January 3, 2019), but other data may be incomplete. It includes members who have represented both the state and the territory, both past and present.

Current members 
Updated January 2023.

 : Kevin Hern (R) (since 2018)
 : Josh Brecheen (R) (since 2023)
 : Frank Lucas (R) (since 1994)
 : Tom Cole (R) (since 2003)
 : Stephanie Bice (R) (since 2021)

List of members and delegates

See also

List of United States senators from Oklahoma
United States congressional delegations from Oklahoma
Oklahoma's congressional districts

References

 
Oklahoma
United States representatives